The Daniels Range is a principal mountain range of the Usarp Mountains, about 80 km (50 mi) long and 16 km (10 mi) wide, bounded to the north by Harlin Glacier and to the south by Gressitt Glacier. The range was mapped by USGS from surveys and U.S. Navy air photos, 1960–63. Named by US-ACAN after Ambassador Paul C. Daniels (1903–86), a leading American figure in the formulation of the Antarctic Treaty in 1959.

In the southern part of Daniels Range is Bounty Nunatak.

Further reading 
 Gunter Faure, Teresa M. Mensing, The Transantarctic Mountains: Rocks, Ice, Meteorites and Water, P 110
  R. L. Oliver, P. R. James, J. B. Jago, Antarctic Earth Science, P 113
 J.W.Sheraton, R.S.Babcock, L.P.Black, D.Wyborn, C.C.Plummer, Petrogenesis of granitic rocks of the daniels range, northern victoria land, antarctica, Precambrian Research Volume 37, Issue 4, December 1987, Pages 267-286 https://doi.org/10.1016/0301-9268(87)90078-7
 R. S. Babcock  C. C. Plummer  J. W. Sheraton  C. J. Adams, Geology of the Daniels Range, North Victoria Land, Antarctica, https://doi.org/10.1002/9781118664957.ch1

See also 
Fikkan Peak
Fisher Spur

References

External links 
 Daniels Range on USGS website
 Daniels Range on AADC website
 Daniels Range on SCAR website
 Daniels Range area map
 Daniels Range current weather
 Daniels Range u[dated long term weather forecast 
 Daniels Range historic weather data

Mountain ranges of Oates Land